The United States lightship Barnegat (LV-79/WAL-506), is located in Camden, Camden County, New Jersey, United States. The lightship was built in 1904 and was added to the National Register of Historic Places on 29 November 1979.

History
Barnegat was built in 1904 by the New York Shipbuilding Company in Camden. The vessel was then used as a relief for the next two years. In 1927 the vessel was assigned to the Barnegat Lighthouse station. In 1942 the vessel was withdrawn from the Barnegat station to serve as an examination vessel at Edgemoor, Delaware. Barnegat would inspect all vessels entering the Delaware River until 1945. The vessel returned to the Barnegat station, where it served until it was decommissioned on 3 March 1967. Barnegat was then donated to the Chesapeake Bay Maritime Museum in Saint Michaels, Maryland. The museum was unable to keep up with the maintenance of the vessel and sold the vessel to the Heritage Ship Guild in 1970 to be displayed at Penn's Landing.

Status
Barnegat is now docked at Pyne Poynt Marina in Camden. Attempts at maintenance and repair work were unsuccessful and the ship is considered to be in threat of loss due to deterioration. In early 2020, the Barnegat Light Historical Society purchased and removed the ship's bell from the deck with hopes of restoring and eventually displaying the bell somewhere in the vicinity of Barnegat Light. In June 2020, the restored bell was unveiled and put on permanent display at the Seventh Street bay side pavilion park in Barnegat Light.

See also
 National Register of Historic Places listings in Camden County, New Jersey
 List of museum ships

References

External links
 United States Lightship Barnegat LV-79 at Abandoned
 View of Barnegat LV 79/WAL 506 via Bing Maps

Buildings and structures in Camden, New Jersey
1904 ships
Lightships of the United States
Ships of the United States Lighthouse Service
Lighthouses on the National Register of Historic Places in New Jersey
National Register of Historic Places in Camden County, New Jersey
New Jersey Register of Historic Places
Museum ships in New Jersey